Wrexham (Welsh: Wrecsam) is a parliamentary constituency centred on the city of Wrexham in the preserved county of Clwyd, Wales in the United Kingdom. It was created in 1918, and is represented in the House of Commons of the UK Parliament from December 2019 by Sarah Atherton of the Conservative Party.

History
Summary of results
Labour won the seat in all general elections from 1935 until 2019, when Conservative Sarah Atherton became the first woman elected to represent Wrexham.

Tom Ellis, first elected in 1970, defected in 1981 to the newly founded Social Democratic Party. In 1983, he unsuccessfully stood for Clwyd South West instead.

Turnout
Turnout has ranged between 59.5% in 2001 and 87.3% in 1950.

Boundaries

Until 1885, Wrexham was part of the Denbighshire parliamentary constituency, which elected one Member of Parliament until the Reform Act 1832 increased this to two members. In 1885 the Denbighshire constituency was split — the area covered today became part of East Denbighshire constituency.

In 1918 the Wrexham constituency was created, electing one Member of Parliament. For the 1983 general election, major boundary reorganisation saw large areas removed from the Wrexham constituency to form the new constituency of Clwyd South West (later to become Clwyd South).

Wrexham constituency consists of the following electoral wards: Acton, Borras Park, Brynyffynnon, Cartrefle, Erddig, Garden Village, Gresford East and West, Grosvenor, Gwersyllt East and South, Gwersyllt North, Gwersyllt West, Hermitage, Holt, Little Acton, Llay, Maesydre, Marford and Hoseley, Offa, Queensway, Rhosnesni, Rossett, Smithfield, Stansty, Whitegate, Wynnstay.

1918–1949: The Municipal Borough of Wrexham, and the Rural District of Wrexham, and part of Chirk.

1950–1983: The Municipal Borough of Wrexham, and part of the Rural Districts of Ceiriog, and Wrexham.

Members of Parliament

Elections

Elections in the 1910s

Elections in the 1920s

Elections in the 1930s

Election in the 1940s
General Election 1939–40:
Another general election was required to take place before the end of 1940. The political parties had been making preparations for an election to take place from 1939 and by the end of this year, the following candidates had been selected; 
Labour: Robert Richards 
Liberal:

Elections in the 1950s

Elections in the 1960s

Elections in the 1970s

Elections in the 1980s

Elections in the 1990s

Elections in the 2000s

Elections in the 2010s

Of the 55 rejected ballots:
43 were either unmarked or it was uncertain who the vote was for.
12 voted for more than one candidate.

Of the 68 rejected ballots:
53 were either unmarked or it was uncertain who the vote was for.
15 voted for more than one candidate.

Of the 70 rejected ballots:
57 were either unmarked or it was uncertain who the vote was for.
9 voted for more than one candidate.
4 had writing or mark by which the voter could be identified.

See also 
 Wrexham (Senedd constituency)
 List of parliamentary constituencies in Clwyd
 1955 Wrexham by-election
 List of parliamentary constituencies in Wales

Notes

References
Specific

General
Craig, F. W. S. (1983). British parliamentary election results 1918-1949 (3 ed.). Chichester: Parliamentary Research Services. .

External links 
Politics Resources (Election results from 1922 onwards)
Electoral Calculus (Election results from 1955 onwards)
2017 Election House Of Commons Library 2017 Election report
A Vision Of Britain Through Time (Constituency elector numbers)

History of Denbighshire
Parliamentary constituencies in North Wales
Constituencies of the Parliament of the United Kingdom established in 1918
Politics of Wrexham